Josh Kirby... Time Warrior! is a film series in six installments produced by Charles Band's Moonbeam Entertainment in Association With The Kushner-Locke Company and released between 1995 and 1996, featuring the fictional character Josh Kirby played by Corbin Allred.

Premise
In the 25th century, humans discover an alien device dubbed the "Nullifier". This device is said to be capable of controlling, or worse, destroying the universe. Irwin 1138, the second-greatest mind of his time splits the Nullifier into six pieces, which are subsequently dispersed through time. Dr. Zoetrope, Irwin's rival and the one man more intelligent than him, seeks to retrieve and reassemble the device the with the help of his time traveling power armor, with Irwin following in his "time pod" to beat his rival to the pieces.

The chase leads them both to 1995, where they encounter 14-year-old Josh Kirby. After a brief conflict, Zoetrope flees into the time stream with a piece of the Nullifier that landed in Kirby's garden, and Irwin gives chase, only to bring Josh along for the ride by accident. Unable to return to his home era, Josh accompanies Irwin, his alien companion Prism and later, half-human warrior Azabeth Siege in the race to collect the Nullifier pieces.

Chapters
The story unfolds over the course of six films:

The Code of Kang
Throughout the series, Azabeth gradually reveals the 21 Codes of Kang, a great historical figure on Azabeth's world.

 These rules share a number, clashing with one another and creating a possible 22 Codes of Kang.

VHS and DVD releases
All six chapters have been released on VHS by Paramount Pictures and Moonbeam Entertainment in the United States and DVD by Tango Entertainment, under license from Kushner-Locke.

Cast
 Corbin Allred as Josh Kirby, a 14-year-old boy from 1995 who is dragged into the chase for the Nullifier. He later discovers he's a Time Warrior, capable of superpowered feats, only once every 12 hours.
 Barrie Ingham as Irwin 1138, a scientist from the 25th century, and the "second-greatest" mind of his time period, Dr. Zoetrope being his better. Using his "Time Pod", he engages in a race to find the individual components of the Nullifier before Zoetrope. Along with the Time Pod, he also relies on a cane, which doubles as an energy weapon.
 Jennifer Burns as Azabeth Siege, a half-human warrior who is somehow displaced in time and subsequently joins
 Derek Webster as Dr. Zoetrope, the greatest mind of his time, exceeding Irwin 1138. While he also seeks the Nullifier, his vehicle of choice is a set of powered armour.
 Steve Blum (credited as David Lucas) as the vocal effects of Prism, an extra-terrestrial creature capable of sensing the pieces of the Nullifier, shown by his glowing, colour-changing hair.

External links

American science fiction films
Films about time travel
Puppet films
Mad scientist films
Films scored by Richard Band
Full Moon Features films
1995 films
1996 films
1990s English-language films
Films directed by Frank Arnold
1990s American films